Il diluvio universale (The great flood) is an azione tragico-sacra, or opera, by Gaetano Donizetti.  The Italian libretto was written by Domenico Gilardoni after Lord Byron's Heaven and Earth and Francesco Ringhieri's tragedy Il diluvio (1788).

Performance history
19th century

The opera premiered at the Teatro San Carlo, Naples on 6 March It failed to become an instant success.

It is known that for the premiere production to be accepted, it had to be given to the church censors in the form of an oratorio, since its planned production date was within the period of fasting.  It was only allowed due to its being a biblical story.

Donizetti revised the opera and a new production opened on 17 January 1834 at Genoa's Teatro Carlo Felice. But after another staging in 1837 in Paris, it disappeared for 147 years.

20th century and beyond

The opera was not presented again until 1985 in Genoa.

The first production in Switzerland took place at St. Gallen where, since 2006, an opera is presented in the open air in front of the Cathedral around the first weekend of July. The production of Il diluvio was also given at the St. Galler Festspiele 2010 when Mirco Palazzi, Majella Cullagh and Manuela Custer appeared.

Roles

Synopsis 
The opera tells the biblical story of the great flood.

Recordings

References
Notes

Cited sources
Ashbrook, William and Sarah Hibberd (2001), in  Holden, Amanda (Ed.), The New Penguin Opera Guide, New York: Penguin Putnam. .  pp. 224 – 247.
Black, John (1982), Donizetti’s Operas in Naples, 1822—1848. London: The Donizetti Society.

Other sources
Allitt, John Stewart (1991), Donizetti: in the light of Romanticism and the teaching of Johann Simon Mayr, Shaftesbury: Element Books, Ltd (UK); Rockport, MA: Element, Inc.(USA)
Ashbrook, William (1982), Donizetti and His Operas, Cambridge University Press.  
Ashbrook, William (1998), "Donizetti, Gaetano" in Stanley Sadie  (Ed.),  The New Grove Dictionary of Opera, Vol. One. London: Macmillan Publishers, Inc.   
Loewenberg, Alfred (1970). Annals of Opera, 1597-1940, 2nd edition.  Rowman and Littlefield
Osborne, Charles, (1994),  The Bel Canto Operas of Rossini, Donizetti, and Bellini,  Portland, Oregon: Amadeus Press. 
Sadie, Stanley, (Ed.); John Tyrell (Exec. Ed.) (2004), The New Grove Dictionary of Music and Musicians.  2nd edition. London: Macmillan.    (hardcover).   (eBook).
 Weinstock, Herbert (1963), Donizetti and the World of Opera in Italy, Paris, and Vienna in the First Half of the Nineteenth Century, New York: Pantheon Books.

External links
 Donizetti Society (London) website
 Libretto (Italian)

Italian-language operas
Operas by Gaetano Donizetti
Operas
Operas set in the Levant
1830 operas
Noah's Ark in popular culture
Opera world premieres at the Teatro San Carlo
Operas based on the Bible